The Land of Make Believe is a family amusement park and water park catering mostly to families and children under 13 years of age. It is designed specifically for parents to participate with their children. Opened in 1954, it is in Hope Township, in Warren County, New Jersey, on County Route 611,  from exit 12 off of Interstate 80. It centers itself around "Safe and wholesome recreation", with entertaining rides and attractions that are most appropriate for children under the age of thirteen, but also has many attractions for people of all ages.

Some of its most prominent attractions are the civil war train (which loops around most of the park), the  Pirate's Wading Pool, largest in America with life size Pirate Ship and the Pirates Escape & Pirates revenge dual racing slides. The Land of Make Believe has many of the standard amusement park rides like a junior sized roller coaster, a Tilt-A-Whirl, Drop & Twist, Tornado, and Scream Machine 360 ultimate upside down thrill ride as well as more specialized attractions like a hay ride and a petting zoo. Some more of the water attractions include the Pirates Plunge, Blackbeard's Pirate Fort, The Sidewinder, Blackbeard's Action River Ride, and eight waterslides. 

Initially, the park featured only attractions for small children, adding some water attractions for children in the late 1980s. Beginning in the first decade of the 2000s, the park has begun to add rides that adults can enjoy but yet are not too extreme for children. These included standard intermediate adult flat rides found in carnivals and amusement parks as well as larger waterslides found in major waterparks.

Scandals/lawsuits/crimes 
In August 2012, police arrested Patrick Deck of Watchung, New Jersey. Deck was an employee of the Land of Make Believe. Deck pleaded guilty with two counts of transporting child pornography. He filmed a child urinating in the restrooms. Some footage was dated between 2002 and 2005. He was previously convicted in 1988 for endangering the welfare of a child. Because of the previous conviction, he faces a minimum of 15 years in state prison.

In 2011, Land of Make Believe was cited for lack of bathrooms and changing stations.

In 2012, former employee Jeremy Carrington sued amusement park director Walter Martowicz III for alleged sexual harassment. He mentioned the director would slap his buttocks, squeeze or push up against him.

In 2016, an ex-employee stole $49,000. The theft began with small purchases and snowballed from there. Tracey Husarenko of East Stroudsburg, Pennsylvania was charged with eight counts of theft and six counts of fraud. She turned herself in that week.

In January 2019, James Bolan, an employee of LOB, sent illicit pictures of himself to someone he thought was a 14-year-old female. He sent them to a Bergen County investigator.

Rides and attractions

Former rides and attractions

Water rides and attractions

References

External links

 Official site

1954 establishments in New Jersey
Amusement parks in New Jersey
Buildings and structures in Warren County, New Jersey
Hope Township, New Jersey
Tourist attractions in Warren County, New Jersey
Amusement parks opened in 1954